Like I Said: Songs 1990–91 is a 1993 album by Ani DiFranco, offering reinterpretations of songs from her first two albums, the eponymous Ani DiFranco (1990) and Not So Soft (1991).

Track listing
All songs by Ani DiFranco.

"Anticipate" – 2:42‡
"Rockabye" – 4:01‡
"Not So Soft" – 3:01‡
"Roll With It" – 3:22‡
"Work Your Way Out" – 3:40†
"Fire Door" – 2:57†
"Gratitude" – 2:44‡
"The Whole Night" – 2:20‡
"Both Hands" – 3:01†
"She Says" – 3:39‡
"Rush Hour" – 4:50†
"Out of Habit" – 2:32†
"Lost Woman Song" – 4:00†
"Talk to Me Now" – 3:57†
"The Slant" – 1:45†

Notes
† Appears on Ani DiFranco
‡ Appears on Not So Soft

References

Ani DiFranco albums
1994 compilation albums
Righteous Babe compilation albums